Luis Barrull Salazar (born 15 February 1948), better known as El Luis, is a Spanish singer in the  styles. His brother Antonio, known as El Zíngaro, is also a rumba singer.

Career 
Barrull was born in A Coruña, Galicia, Spain, on 15 February 1948. As a young boy he moved to Argentina, where he stayed for 15 years. It was there where he started to sing flamenco.

After returning to Spain, he scored a huge hit with his first single "Te Lo Digo Cantando" in 1976. After releasing two full albums, El Luis in 1976 and Solo in 1978 both on CBS, Barrull was jailed in Madrid's Carabanchel Prison Madrid due to drug smuggling. While in jail he became more religious. After his release he went to New York to record his third album entitled Gitano Soul. All three albums were produced by José Luis de Carlos. He also wrote songs for Las Grecas, Los Chichos, and his brother El Zíngaro before retiring from the music business.

He made a comeback 1991 with Vis a Vis on AR Productions SL, an independent label owned by a former CBS executive, Alfonso Corral, specializing in keeping the flame of flamenco with pop artists like Camel, Chestnut and El Luis.

Discography

Albums 
1976: El Luis
1978: Solo
1981: Gitano Soul
1991: Vis a vis]
Compilation albums
2000: Yo te lo digo cantando
2002: Todas sus grabaciones (1976–1991)

Singles 
"Yo te lo digo cantando"
"Beibe, no huyas más"
"Pero qué es triste llorar y llorar"
"Solo"
"Llorando"
"Oh, Libertad"

References 

1948 births
Living people
Catalan rumba
Flamenco musicians